The División de Honor (Honor Division) is the top Peruvian futsal league organized by the Peruvian Football Federation.

History 
Futsal was created in Uruguay around 1930 by Juan Carlos Ceriani a professor of physical education of the Montevideo's Young Men's Christian Association (YMCA). Later, the sport was introduced in Perú, around 1960, by Lima's YMCA.

During the 1970s Dante Vargas and the Instituto Nacional de Recreación (National Recreation Institute) tried to promote the sport, but they failed because of the popularity of street football. Years later, the Peruvian Football Federation, helped by some Regatas Lima club members, tried to develop a program to promote futsal, but it failed again.

Finally, in 1999, the Peruvian Football Federation and its National Futsal Commission achieved a consolidation of the sport. At first, the league was named División Superior (Higher Division) and later, in 2010, it changed to its currently name. Also, it had little media coverage until 2009, when CMD started to retransmit the matches.

In 2004, Deportivo Kansas (runner-up in the 2003 season) won the Copa Merconorte and qualified to the final of the Copa Libertadores de Futsal (South American Club Futsal Championship). Kansas lost the final against Malwee/Jaraguá, however that remains the most successful international participation for a Peruvian futsal club.

Since 2010, Panta Walon and Primero de Mayo have dominated the league; both teams played in all the finals from the 2010 to the 2018 season. During this period, Panta won six titles and 1.° de Mayo two. This match is called the Clásico del fútbol sala peruano (Peruvian futsal derby).

List of champions

Titles by club

Scorers by season

See also 

 Peru national futsal team

References

External links 

 Official account on Facebook.

Futsal in Peru